

534001–534100 

|-bgcolor=#f2f2f2
| colspan=4 align=center | 
|}

534101–534200 

|-bgcolor=#f2f2f2
| colspan=4 align=center | 
|}

534201–534300 

|-id=299
| 534299 Parazynski ||  || Scott E. Parazynski (born 1961) served in the NASA astronaut corps from 1992 to 2009, completing five space shuttle missions and seven spacewalks. A physician and prolific inventor, he has explored space and extreme environments on Earth from the depths of the ocean, to "level zero" of an active volcano, to the summit of Mt. Everest. || 
|}

534301–534400 

|-bgcolor=#f2f2f2
| colspan=4 align=center | 
|}

534401–534500 

|-bgcolor=#f2f2f2
| colspan=4 align=center | 
|}

534501–534600 

|-bgcolor=#f2f2f2
| colspan=4 align=center | 
|}

534601–534700 

|-bgcolor=#f2f2f2
| colspan=4 align=center | 
|}

534701–534800 

|-bgcolor=#f2f2f2
| colspan=4 align=center | 
|}

534801–534900 

|-bgcolor=#f2f2f2
| colspan=4 align=center | 
|}

534901–535000 

|-bgcolor=#f2f2f2
| colspan=4 align=center | 
|}

References 

534001-535000